Catfish are a group of primarily freshwater fish.

Catfish may also refer to:
 Ictaluridae, a family of catfish native to North America
 Ictalurus, a genus of North American freshwater catfishes

Places
 Catfish Creek (disambiguation), United States and Canada
 Catfish Mountain, New Jersey, United States

Arts and entertainment

Film and television
 Catfish (film), a 2010 film about a New York photographer engaged in an online romance
 Catfish: The TV Show, an MTV program debuting in November 2012, based on the film

Music
 Catfish Records, a British record label of the early 20th century

Groups
 Catfish (band), a band fronted by Don Walker
 Catfish and the Bottlemen, Welsh Indie band

Songs
 "Catfish" (Bob Dylan song), a song about Catfish Hunter on Dylan's The Bootleg Series Volumes 1–3 (Rare & Unreleased) 1961–1991
 "Catfish" (Four Tops song) (1976)
 "Catfish" (Tamar Braxton song) (2015)

People
 James W. "Catfish" Cole (1924–1967), a leader of the Ku Klux Klan of North Carolina and South Carolina
 Catfish Collins (1944–2010), rhythm guitarist
 Catfish Hunter (1946–1999), American Major League Baseball pitcher
 Catfish Keith (born 1962), blues singer/songwriter Keith Daniel Kozacik
 Catfish McDaris (born 1953), American poet and author
 Catfish Metkovich (1920–1995), American Major League Baseball player
 Milburn Smith (1912–1994), American college football and basketball coach and All-American football player
 Vernon Smith (American football) (1908–1988), American college football, basketball and baseball player and basketball coach
 Catfish Stephenson, American blues musician
 Catfish Billy (born 1979), alias of the American rapper Yelawolf

Other uses
 Catfish, a label for various fluorescence in situ hybridization (FISH) assays
 Catfish, a railfan nickname for Norfolk Southern Railway wide cab locomotives
 Columbus Catfish, a baseball team in the South Atlantic League
 USS Catfish (SS-339), a submarine

See also
 
 Catfishing, a slang term used for trying to elicit personal information from people on social media
 Mudcat (disambiguation)

Lists of people by nickname